This is a list of properties and districts in Illinois that are on the National Register of Historic Places. There are over 1,900 in total. Of these, 85 are National Historic Landmarks. There are listings in all of the state's 102 counties.



Numbers of listings by county

Adams County

Alexander County

Bond County

|}

Boone County

|}

Brown County

|}

Former listing

|}

Bureau County

Calhoun County

Carroll County

Cass County

|}

Former listing

|}

Champaign County

Christian County

|}

Clark County

Clay County

|}

Clinton County

|}

Coles County

Cook County

Crawford County

Cumberland County

|}

DeKalb County

DeWitt County

|}

Douglas County

|}

Former listing

|}

DuPage County

Edgar County

Edwards County

|}

Effingham County

|}

Fayette County

|}

Former listings

|}

Ford County

|}

Franklin County

|}

Fulton County

Gallatin County

Greene County

Grundy County

Hamilton County

|}

Hancock County

Hardin County

|}

Henderson County

|}

Henry County

Iroquois County

|}

Jackson County

Jasper County

|}

Jefferson County

|}

Jersey County

Jo Daviess County

Johnson County

|}

Kane County

Kankakee County

Kendall County

Knox County

LaSalle County

Lake County

Lawrence County

|}

Lee County

Livingston County

Logan County

McDonough County

McHenry County

McLean County

Macon County

Macoupin County

Madison County

Marion County

Marshall County

|}

Mason County

|}

Massac County

|}

Former listing

|}

Menard County

|}

Mercer County

Monroe County

Montgomery County

Morgan County

Moultrie County

|}

Ogle County

Peoria County

Perry County

|}

Piatt County

|}

Pike County

Pope County

|}

Pulaski County

|}

Putnam County

|}

Randolph County

Richland County

|}

Rock Island County

St. Clair County

Saline County

|}

Sangamon County

Schuyler County

|}

Scott County

|}

Shelby County

|}

Stark County

|}

Stephenson County

Tazewell County

Union County

Vermilion County

Wabash County

|}

Warren County

Washington County

|}

Wayne County

|}

White County

Whiteside County

Will County

Williamson County

|}

Winnebago County

Woodford County

See also

 List of National Historic Landmarks in Illinois
 List of NRHP Multiple Property Submissions in Illinois
 List of archaeological sites on the National Register of Historic Places in Illinois
 List of bridges on the National Register of Historic Places in Illinois
 United States National Register of Historic Places listings

References

 
Illinois